Geoffrey B. Morawetz is Chief Justice of the Superior Court of Justice in Ontario, Canada.  He was first appointed to the bench in 2005. On December 18, 2013 he was appointed Regional Senior Justice for the Toronto Region of the Superior Court. On June 27, 2019, Prime Minister Justin Trudeau announced the appointment of Regional Senior Justice Morawetz as Chief Justice of the Superior Court of Justice of Ontario, effective July 1, 2019, replacing the Honourable Heather J. Smith.

References 

Year of birth missing (living people)
Living people
Judges in Ontario